The Andrei Sakharov Freedom Award, officially known as the Sakharov Freedom Award and named after Soviet scientist and dissident Andrei Sakharov, was established in 1980 by the Norwegian Helsinki Committee with the support and consent of Andrei Sakharov himself, to help people who, because of their opinions, beliefs, and conscience are persecuted or imprisoned.
The fund's assets are to be used for direct support to those persecuted in their home country, mainly by granting the Sakharov Freedom Award.

Laureates

See also

Sakharov Prize

References 

Human rights awards
Free expression awards
Awards established in 1980